Gerardo I. Lopez, also known as Gerry Lopez,  is the former CEO and President of Extended Stay America, Inc. He was previously CEO and President of AMC Entertainment Holdings, Inc.; Marquee Holdings Inc.; and AMC Entertainment Inc. (AMC Theatres).

Biography

Education
Lopez earned his Bachelor of Science in Business Administration from George Washington University in 1980 and his Master's in Business Administration in Finance from Harvard Business School in 1984.

Career
Lopez served as Chief Executive Officer and President of AMC Theatres since March 2009, and was also elected to the company's Board of Directors. Lopez was the fourth CEO in the chain's almost 90-year history.

Prior to joining AMC Theatres, Lopez served as executive vice president of Starbucks Coffee Company and president of its Global Consumer Products, Seattle's Best Coffee and Foodservice divisions. In these roles, Lopez led the strategy to support Starbucks' growth and expansion of consumer product offerings worldwide. As he describes it, he was responsible for "extending the Starbucks Experience" and "taking care of the customer everywhere and anytime they are not in a Starbucks store."

Lopez has been active on several public and private company boards, including TXU Corporation, Safeco Insurance and the supply chain startup SilkRoute Global. Additionally, he has recently been appointed to the board of National CineMedia, Inc., (NASDAQ: NCMI) a cinema advertising company; Digital Cinema Implementation Partners, LLC., a partnership implementing digital cinema deployment in theatres; and Midland Empire Partners, LLC, organized to design, develop and own Kansas City venues the Midland by AMC and AMC Mainstreet in partnership with the Cordish Co. and Anschutz Entertainment Group. He was a member of the Cranbrook Institute of Science Board of Governors in Bloomfield Hills, Mich., and has been recognized by Hispanic Business Magazine as one of the Top 100 Hispanic Business Leaders.

Lopez was previously part of the entertainment industry during 2000–2004, when he served as president at Handleman Entertainment Resources, which provided category management and pre-recorded music distribution services to Wal-Mart, Best Buy and other major retailers in the US and abroad. In his more than 25-year career he also has served in a variety of executive management positions with International Home Foods, Frito-Lay, Pepsi-Cola and the Procter & Gamble Company.

In 2012, Lopez was recognized by Hispanic Executive as a Visionary in the magazine's Best of 2012 list, which featured more than 20 notable Latino business professionals. In 2016, Lopez was honored as a member of The Alumni Society's Class of 2016.

References

American chief executives of travel and tourism industry companies
Cuban emigrants to the United States
George Washington University School of Business alumni
Harvard Business School alumni
Living people
AMC Theatres
Year of birth missing (living people)